In mathematics, the Askey scheme is a way of organizing orthogonal polynomials of hypergeometric or basic hypergeometric type into a hierarchy.

Askey scheme for hypergeometric orthogonal polynomials

 give the following version of the Askey scheme:

 Wilson | Racah
 Continuous dual Hahn | Continuous Hahn | Hahn | dual Hahn
 Meixner–Pollaczek | Jacobi | Pseudo Jacobi | Meixner | Krawtchouk
 Laguerre | Bessel | Charlier
 Hermite
Here  indicates a hypergeometric series representation with  parameters

Askey scheme for basic hypergeometric orthogonal polynomials

 give the following scheme for basic hypergeometric orthogonal polynomials:
 
43 Askey–Wilson | q-Racah
32 Continuous dual q-Hahn | Continuous q-Hahn | Big q-Jacobi | q-Hahn | dual q-Hahn
21 Al-Salam–Chihara | q-Meixner–Pollaczek | Continuous q-Jacobi | Big q-Laguerre | Little q-Jacobi | q-Meixner | Quantum q-Krawtchouk | q-Krawtchouk | Affine q-Krawtchouk | Dual q-Krawtchouk
20/11 Continuous big q-Hermite | Continuous q-Laguerre | Little q-Laguerre | q-Laguerre | q-Bessel | q-Charlier | Al-Salam–Carlitz I | Al-Salam–Carlitz II
10 Continuous q-Hermite | Stieltjes–Wigert | Discrete q-Hermite I | Discrete q-Hermite II

Completeness
While there are several approaches to constructing still more general families of orthogonal polynomials, it is usually not possible to extend the Askey scheme by reusing hypergeometric functions of the same form. For instance, one might naively hope to find new examples given by

above  which corresponds to the Wilson polynomials.

for some polynomial .

References

Orthogonal polynomials
Hypergeometric functions
Q-analogs